Seenu Vasanthi Lakshmi  is a 2003 Telugu tragedy drama film directed by E. Srinivas.  The film stars R. P. Patnaik playing the eponymous character of a blind village singer, along with Padmapriya Janakiraman and Navaneet Kaur in other prominent roles. The film is a remake of 1999 Malayalam film Vasanthiyum Lakshmiyum Pinne Njaanum. The film score and soundtrack was composed by R. P. Patnaik. The film though a commercial failure at the time of release has over time attained cult status, through several re-runs on television.

Cast 
 R. P. Patnaik as Seenu
 Padmapriya Janakiraman as Vasanthi
 Navaneet Kaur as Lakshmi
 Prakash Raj as Appala Naidu
 Nutan Prasad as Seenu's father
 Giri Babu as Seenu's uncle
 Sunil as Seenu's brother-in-law
 Raghu Babu
 Brahmanandam as Classical singer
 Radhika Chaudhari
 Ali as Guest appearance in song "America Annadu"

Soundtrack 

The soundtrack album was composed by R. P. Patnaik. Lyrics were penned by Kulasekhar. All the songs have been sung by R. P. Patnaik.

References

External links 
 

2000s Telugu-language films
Telugu remakes of Malayalam films
Films about blind people in India
Films scored by R. P. Patnaik
Indian drama films
Films about disability in India
2003 drama films
2003 films